Mykola Hrinchenko (born 27 February 1986, Ukrainian SSR, Soviet Union) is a professional Ukrainian football midfielder who plays for Kharkiv in the Ukrainian Premier League.

External links 
 Official Website Profile

1986 births
Living people
Ukrainian footballers
FC Kharkiv players
Association football midfielders